Barclay Allen (born June 23, 1945) is a former Canadian football quarterback and defensive back who played in the Canadian Football League from 1970 to 1974. He played college football for the Southern Illinois Salukis. In 1969, Allen was the Salukis' starting quarterback. He signed with the Montreal Alouettes the following year and later played for the Ottawa Rough Riders and Calgary Stampeders over a total of 49 games. Although his original position was as quarterback, Allen saw little time in that role, throwing only two passes during his CFL career. Instead, he spent most of his time as a defensive halfback, making five interceptions over his career, including a pick six.

References 

1945 births
Living people
American football quarterbacks
Canadian football quarterbacks
Canadian football defensive backs
Southern Illinois Salukis football players
Montreal Alouettes players
Ottawa Rough Riders players
Calgary Stampeders players